Actias winbrechlini is a moth in the family Saturniidae. It is found in China (Yunnan) and Burma.

References

winbrechlini
Moths described in 2007
Moths of Asia